Smart Cities Mission along with Atal Mission for Rejuvenation and Urban Transformation (AMRUT) and Urban Housing Mission was launched on 25 June 2015 under the leadership of Narendra Modi by Ministry of Housing and Urban Affairs. Smart City Mission is one of the pet projects of Government of India wherein Government is aspiring to create 100 Smart cities in time to come. Surat Municipal Corporation (SMC) is selected on the list of 98 smart cities declared by the Government of India for the expansion of Smart Cities Mission. Surat is selected in the first round of selected 20 Smart Cities and has implemented largest number of projects under Smart City Mission. It received an award by Ministry of Housing and Urban Affairs, Government of India for its work in the areas of urban environment, mobility, transport and sustainable integrated development. The objective of Surat Smart City is 'To promote cities that provide core infrastructure and give a decent quality of life to its citizens, a clean and sustainable environment and application of 'Smart Solutions'. Surat Smart City Development Limited (SSCDL) is formed as a Special Purpose Vehicle (SPV) for the implementation of the Smart City projects at the city level. Surat Smart City Development Limited got incorporated on 31 March 2016.

Tie ups 

 Microsoft City's next Initiative has tied up with Tata Consultancy Services and Wipro so that it can grasp the sustainable growth of the cities in India. The first IT Smart City in India Under this initiative is Surat. Surat Municipal Corporation and Microsoft will together transform Surat into a smart city.
 Surat Municipal Corporation has also tied up with IBM in order to provide better citizen service with aid of IBM Smarter City program to help them address challenges like waste management, disaster management and citizen services.

Projects 
Surat Municipal Corporation has set a special purpose vehicle (SPV), Surat Smart City Development Limited (SSCDL) for implementing the developing projects. It has completed 53 works worth Rs. 1204 crores within two years out of total 76 projects worth Rs. 2988 crores. Few amongst the various projects launched by SSCDL are as below

Integrated Traffic and Mobility Administration Centre 
This center caters various departments which are involved in management of the city traffic such as BRTS, city bus, traffic police, RTO, fire, emergency services, etc. IT applications present with these agencies helps them coordinate with each other and manage traffic operations. SMC also as a transit system for BRTS and city bus that shows real time vehicle location and other required information. Adoptive Traffic Control System (ATCS) in BRTS, and CCTV cameras will extend in all the major locations along with IT-MAC. The center is assumed to be a single stop source in resolving all the issues.

Incubation Centre 
SSCDL has created a Incubation Centre. The Incubation Centre was inaugurated on January 31, 2019 at SEPC Building in Udhna. It was set up at a cost of Rs. 2 crores SMC and SSCDL has set up an institution named AIC SURATi iLAB Foundation to promote culture of innovation, trade facilitation and startups under Smart Cities Mission. SURATi iLAB has 18 partners including Sardar Vallabhbhai Patel Institute of Technology, Auro University and SETU Foundation. It proposes to help semi-skilled and skilled job seekers in various trades. The authorities assume that creation of similar infrastructure shall help in promoting the Start Up Ecosystem in the City and shall contribute in the Digital India Initiative. Recently the same center had organized a 24 hour Surat all-round technology hackathon on September 27 and 28. The aim behind organizing this Hackathon was to encourage startups from various sectors and to get solutions for city's various problems.

SUMAN eye (CCTV Network) 
SSCDL proposed  to implement CCTV Based Surveillance System, "Suman Eye" with a view to monitoring the civic facilities and services across Surat City with an objective to improve the service delivery more proactively. Moreover, "Suman Eye Project" also intends to improve the safety and security at Bus Stations, Gardens, Suman High schools and Municipal Board schools.

The Suman Eye Project will cover following locations for monitoring (Taken from the Tender Copy of Project)

 Municipal Board Schools
 Suman High School
 BRTS Bus Stops
 Public Parks
 Infrastructure Construction Site
 Water works
 Water Distribution Plants
 Overloaded container spots
 Water logging spots

The Suman Eye Project composes of below mentioned broad components

 2 MP IR IP Dome camera
 2 MP IR IP Bullet Camera
 2 MP IR IP Vandal Proof Dome Camera
 2 MP IR IP Vandal Proof Bullet Camera
 2 MP IR IP PTZ Camera
 Network Video Recorder
 Video Management Software
 Server, Storage, Network Switch and other Data Centre Equipment's
 Pole, cable and other related accessories

Awards and accolades 
SSCDL is incidental in launch of various e- Governance and m-Governance projects which have been recognised at national/international level. Below is Partial list of Awards presented to SSCDL:

 SSCDL bags three Smart Urbanization Awards by Smart Cities Council of India at Bengaluru.
 Business World Smart Cities Award 2016 (winner) for SMC Mobile App
 Surat Smart City has been selected for the City Award for "great momentum" in implementation of projects under India Smart City Awards by Housing and Urban Affairs Minister.

References

External links 
 https://www.suratsmartcity.com

Smart cities in India